In mathematics, a Smarandache–Wellin number is an integer that in a given base is the concatenation of the first n prime numbers written in that base. Smarandache–Wellin numbers are named after Florentin Smarandache and Paul R. Wellin.

The first decimal Smarandache–Wellin numbers are:

2, 23, 235, 2357, 235711, 23571113, 2357111317, 235711131719, 23571113171923, 2357111317192329, ... .

Smarandache–Wellin prime 
A Smarandache–Wellin number that is also prime is called a Smarandache–Wellin prime. The first three are 2, 23 and 2357 . The fourth is 355 digits long: it is the result of concatenating the first 128 prime numbers, through 719.

The primes at the end of the concatenation in the Smarandache–Wellin primes are
2, 3, 7, 719, 1033, 2297, 3037, 11927, ... .

The indices of the Smarandache–Wellin primes in the sequence of Smarandache–Wellin numbers are:
1, 2, 4, 128, 174, 342, 435, 1429, ... .

The 1429th Smarandache–Wellin number is a probable prime with 5719 digits ending in 11927, discovered by Eric W. Weisstein in 1998. If it is proven prime, it will be the eighth Smarandache–Wellin prime. In March 2009, Weisstein's search showed the index of the next Smarandache–Wellin prime (if one exists) is at least 22077.

See also
 Copeland–Erdős constant
 Champernowne constant, another example of a number obtained by concatenating a representation in a given base.

References

External links

List of first 54 Smarandache–Wellin numbers with factorizations
Smarandache–Wellin primes at The Prime Glossary
Smith, S. "A Set of Conjectures on Smarandache Sequences." Bull. Pure Appl. Sci. 15E, 101–107, 1996.

Base-dependent integer sequences
Prime numbers